The Vice is an ITV police drama about the Metropolitan Police Vice Unit, which ran for five series of varying lengths between 1999 and 2003. The main cast included Ken Stott, Caroline Catz and David Harewood, as well as Rosie Marcel, Marc Warren and Tim Pigott-Smith. The show experimented with different formats, two series of two-part, one-hour episodes; two series of ninety-minute episodes, and then a final series of self-contained one-hour episodes. The Portishead track "Sour Times" was used as the theme music to the show.

"Hooked", although often referred to as the first episode of series five, and broadcast in 2003 prior to the broadcast of series five, was officially classified as the last episode of series four as it featured the last appearance of Pat Chappel, and was filmed during the filming block of series four. It was also the last episode to be ninety-minutes long, before the transfer to one-hour episodes, and it was also the last time that the original title card and sequence were used.

Main cast

Episodes

Series overview

Series 1 (1999)

Series 2 (2000)

Series 3 (2001)

Series 4 (2002)

Series 5 (2003)

DVD releases

Region 2
Series 1: 7 July 2003, released in the United Kingdom by Carlton.
Series 1–5: 20 February 2006, released in the UK by Network

Region 1
Series 1: 25 March 2008, released in the US by MPI Home Video.
Series 2: 24 June 2008, released in the US by MPI Home Video.

External links
Paul Lewis, 2008: Review of the DVD release of the second series of The Vice. DVDCompare

1999 British television series debuts
2003 British television series endings
1990s British crime drama television series
1990s British police procedural television series
1990s British workplace drama television series
2000s British crime drama television series
2000s British police procedural television series
2000s British workplace drama television series
British detective television series
Carlton Television
English-language television shows
ITV television dramas
Television series by ITV Studios
Television series by Banijay
Television shows set in London